Son of a Stranger is a 1957 British film directed by Ernest Morris and starring James Kenney, Ann Stephens, and Victor Maddern.

References

External links

1958 films
British crime drama films
1950s English-language films
Films directed by Ernest Morris
1950s British films